OSPM may refer to:

Operating System-directed configuration and Power Management, a computer specification for device configuration and power management by the operating system 
Operational Street Pollution Model, an atmospheric dispersion model